Coronation Park is a multi-use stadium in Sunyani, Ghana, capable of holding 5,000 people. It is used mostly for football matches, and is the home stadium of Bofoakwa Tano, Bechem Chelsea and Brong-Ahafo United.  It was expanded and modernised by the npp government in 2008 during the cup of nations in Ghana although it was not one of the venues.  Chairs from the renovated Accra sports stadium was sent to the Sunyani stadium to improve upon its standard.  The venue is sometimes used by some of the junior national teams for friendlies.  Currently it is not used by any premiership club in the country.

References 

 

Football venues in Ghana